Buena Vista Hotel may refer to:

Buena Vista Hotel (Safford, Arizona), listed on the NRHP in Arizona
Buena Vista Hotel (Stamford, Texas), listed on the NRHP in Texas